Aldourie ( meaning dark water or stream water) is a small crofting village on the east shore of Loch Ness. Aldourie Castle, seat of the Laird on Dunbar, is close to the village of Aldourie.

Aldourie Castle had minor alterations to the dining room and other sundry areas designed by Robert Lorimer in 1902.

In 2015, Aldourie Castle was purchased for £15 million by Danish billionaire Anders Holch Povlsen

References

Populated places in Inverness committee area
Tower houses in Scotland
Loch Ness